Felipe Hernández may refer to:

 Felipe Hernández (footballer) (born 1988), Chilean footballer
 Felipe Enríquez Hernández (born 1969), Mexican diplomat and politician
 Felipe Hernandez (architect) (born 1971), Colombian-born architect in the United Kingdom
 Felipe Hernández (soccer) (born 1998), Colombian-American professional soccer player